For 圓, 圆, 元, 円, or 원 as a currency, see:
Chinese Yuan, the Chinese currency base unit
Renminbi, the currency of People's Republic of China
New Taiwan dollar, the currency of Republic of China
Japanese yen, the currency of Japan
Taiwan yen, the currency of Taiwan of Empire of Japan between 1895 and 1946
Korean yen, the currency of Korea of Empire of Japan between 1910 and 1945
B yen, the currency of US-occupied Okinawa between 1948 and 1958
Korean won, the currency of Korea between 1902 and 1910
North Korean Won, the currency of North Korea
South Korean won (1945), the currency of South Korea between 1945 and 1953
South Korean Won, the currency of South Korea
For 圓, 圆, 円, or 원 in Math, see:
Circle, shape and mathematical concept